Downbelow can refer to:
Downbelow, also known as Pell's World, a fictional planet in C. J. Cherryh's Alliance-Union universe
Downbelow Station, a 1981 science fiction novel by C. J. Cherryh
Downbelow, an unused portion of Babylon 5 (fictional space station)

See also
Down Below (disambiguation)